Polito is an Italian surname that may refer to:

People
Ciro Polito (born 1979), Italian footballer
Enzo Polito (born 1926), Italian water polo player who competed in the 1952 Summer Olympics
Gene Polito (1918–2010), American cinematographer, mechanical engineer and academic
Giuseppe Polito (born 1988), Italian footballer
Jim Polito, American radio talk show host
Jon Polito (1950–2016), American actor
Karyn Polito (born 1966), American politician
Lina Polito (born 1954), Italian actress
Robert Polito (born 1951), American academic, critic and poet
Sol Polito (1892–1960), Academy Award nominated cinematographer
Stephen Polito (1760s–1814), menagerie owner of Italian descent

Other uses
Polytechnic University of Turin (Politecnico di Torino), a technical university in Turin, Italy